Luciobarbus leptopogon is a species of ray-finned fish in the genus Luciobarbus which is found in Algeria.

References 

 

Luciobarbus
Endemic fauna of Algeria
Fish described in 1834